Edward Thomas Mieszkowski (October 14, 1925 – February 15, 2004) was an American football tackle who played two seasons with the Brooklyn Dodgers of the All-America Football Conference. He was drafted by the Boston Yanks in the seventh round of the 1946 NFL Draft. He played college football at the University of Notre Dame and attended Tilden High School in Chicago, Illinois.

Early years
Mieszkowski participated in high school football and wrestling at Tilden High School.

College career
Mieszkowski played for the Notre Dame Fighting Irish from 1943 to 1945. He played in the 1946 College All-Star Game against the Los Angeles Rams.

Professional career
Mieszkowski was selected by the Boston Yanks with the 52nd pick in the 1946 NFL Draft.

Brooklyn Dodgers
Mieszkowski played in 23 games, starting seven, for the Brooklyn Dodgers from 1946 to 1947.

Coaching career
Mieszkowski was a coach at Mt. Carmel High School from 1948 to 1954. He first served as a coach under head coach Terry Brennan and the team won several city championships. He became head coach upon the departure of Brennan and then won several championships. Mieszkowski became the line coach at Marquette University in 1956 and spent several years there.

Personal life
Mieszkowski started the Tilden Tech Alumni Association and later took over Notre Dame's Monogram Club, an alumni association for athletes. He developed progressive multiple sclerosis in 1954. He became a financial planner after his coaching career. Mieszkowski died on February 15, 2004, at his home in Lombard, Illinois due to complications from multiple sclerosis.

References

External links
 Just Sports Stats

1925 births
2004 deaths
20th-century American businesspeople
American financial businesspeople
American football tackles
Brooklyn Dodgers (AAFC) players
Marquette Golden Avalanche football coaches
Notre Dame Fighting Irish football players
High school football coaches in Illinois
Sportspeople from Chicago
Players of American football from Chicago
Businesspeople from Illinois
Financial planners
Neurological disease deaths in Illinois
Deaths from multiple sclerosis